Darkness and Light is the fifth studio album by American singer, songwriter, and pianist John Legend. It was released on December 2, 2016, by Columbia Records, as well as his last album to be released with GOOD Music, following the end of his five-album contract with the label.

Recording and production 
Legend recorded the album at East West Studio 2 in Los Angeles. It was produced almost entirely by Blake Mills, who also played various instruments and co-produced most of the songs. Legend also collaborated with rapper Chance the Rapper, and vocalists Brittany Howard and Miguel.

Singles
The album's lead single "Love Me Now" was released on October 7, 2016. On October 6, 2016, the music video was released for the single. On November 18, 2016, the album's second single "Penthouse Floor" featuring Chance the Rapper, was released. On November 25, 2016, the album's first promotional single "I Know Better", was released and on March 27, 2017, was announced that the album's third single is "Surefire".

Commercial performance
In the United States, Darkness and Light debuted at number 14 on the Billboard 200, with 38,000 album-equivalent units, marking the sixth highest debut of the week. The album selling 26,000 copies in its first week. The album was also streamed 12.5 million times in the first week.

Critical reception 
Darkness and Light was met with generally positive reviews. At Metacritic, which assigns a normalized rating out of 100 to reviews from mainstream critics, the album received an average score of 76, based on 10 reviews.

Reviewing the album in The New York Times, Jon Pareles applauded its treatment of love as a multi-dimensional theme and "as something far more complex than a panacea and a fount of perpetual reassurance, with music to match". Writing for Vice, Robert Christgau cited the title track, "Marching Into the Dark", and "I Know Better" as highlights and said the lyric from the latter song ("My history has brought me to this place/This power and the color of my face") is "not an easy brag to bring off modestly, and the more I listen the more I appreciate the trick".

Track listing
All tracks produced by Blake Mills, except where noted.

Notes
 "What You Do to Me", "Surefire", "Marching Into the Dark", and "Love You Anyway" features background vocals by Jessy Wilson.
 "What You Do to Me" and "Surefire" features background vocals by Holly Laessig and Jess Wolfe. 
 "Temporarily Painless" and "How Can I Blame You" features background vocals by Z Berg.
 "Temporarily Painless" features background vocals by Perfume Genius.
 "Drawing Lines" features background vocals by Moses Sumney.

Charts

Weekly charts

Year-end charts

Certifications

References

Further reading

External links 
 

2016 albums
Albums produced by Blake Mills
Albums produced by Eg White
Columbia Records albums
GOOD Music albums
John Legend albums